Elena Basile (born 26 December 1959 Naples) is an Italian author and diplomat. From 2013 to 2021, she was ambassador to Sweden and Belgium. She was awarded the Order of Merit of the Italian Republic.

She gave a speech on Festa della Repubblica.

Life 
She graduated from Università degli Studi di Napoli "L'Orientale".

In 1985, she joined the foreign service. After some years in Madagascar as second secretary to the italian embassy in Antananarivo, she served at the consulate in Toronto. From 1999 to 2002, she was delegate in Budapest. From 2003 to 2007, she was delegate in Lisbon. In 2008, she was Head of the Organization for Security and Co-operation in Europe Section. From 2010 to 2012, she headed the North America department. From 2013 to 2017 she was an ambassador to Stockholm.

See also 
 Ministry of Foreign Affairs (Italy)
 Foreign relations of Italy

References

External links 
 Ambassador Elena Basile and Mr. Erik Simonsen, Embassy of Italy in Sweden | Flickr

Italian women ambassadors
1959 births
Living people
Ambassadors of Italy to Belgium
Ambassadors of Italy to Sweden
Italian diplomats
21st-century diplomats